Folate receptor beta is a protein that in humans is encoded by the FOLR2 gene.

The protein encoded by this gene is a member of the folate receptor (FOLR) family. Members of this gene family have a high affinity for folic acid and for several reduced folic acid derivatives, and mediate delivery of 5-methyltetrahydrofolate to the interior of cells.  This protein has a 68% and 79% sequence homology with the FOLR1 and FOLR3 proteins, respectively. The FOLR2 protein was originally thought to exist only in placenta, but is also detected in spleen, bone marrow, and thymus.

References

Further reading